Frederick Michael Sheahan (5 September 1870 – 29 December 1946) was an Australian rules footballer who played with Melbourne in the Victorian Football League (VFL).

Notes

External links 

1870 births
Australian rules footballers from Melbourne
Melbourne Football Club players
1946 deaths
Melbourne Football Club (VFA) players